Dallowgill (historically also Dallaghill) is a village in Harrogate district in North Yorkshire, England.  It consists of a number of scattered settlements in the western part of the civil parish of Laverton.

History 

Dallowgill takes its name from Dallow, now a small settlement in the south of the area.  Dallow is derived from dael haga, meaning "enclosure in the dale".  "Dallowgill" was originally applied to the ravine or gill of the River Laver below Dallow.

Historically Dallowgill was part of the ancient parish of Kirkby Malzeard in the West Riding of Yorkshire.  It became a separate parish in 1844.  When civil parishes were created in 1866 it became part of the civil parish of Laverton, which now shares a parish council with Kirkby Malzeard (Kirkby Malzeard, Laverton and Dallowgill Parish Council).  Dallowgill remains a separate ecclesiastical parish, now part of the benefice of the Fountains Group of parishes.

Buildings and structures 

The parish church of St Peter was built in 1842.  It closed in 2011.  There is also a Methodist chapel.

The Greygarth Monument commemorates Queen Victoria's Diamond Jubilee in 1897.  At Carlesmoor in the north of the parish there is a sighting tower.

Dotted around Dallowgill are 22 mosaic panels depicting local scenes and wildlife.  They were created and positioned in 1997 by local artists calling themselves the Crackpots.

References

External links 
 Dallowgill community website

Villages in North Yorkshire